Thomas van der Noot (c. 1475 – c. 1525) was a publisher and author of the early 16th century, from a prominent family from Brussels. He was credited with publishing the earliest printed cookbook in the Dutch language, Een notabel boecxken van cokeryen (A Remarkable Book on Cooking), published around 1514.

References

Book publishers (people) of the Habsburg Netherlands
Belgian non-fiction writers
Belgian male writers
Writers of the Habsburg Netherlands
Writers from Brussels
1470s births
1520s deaths
Male non-fiction writers